Shikaripur or Shikaripura is a major town in Shimoga district in the Indian state of Karnataka. It is the headquarters of Shikaripur taluk and is known as the land of shivasharanas.

Geography
It has an average elevation of 603 m (1978 ft). It lies between plain land and mostly tropical forests of Malenadu region. Shikaripura is one of the junction to connect north karnataka to Malenadu .

Demographics

 India census, Shikaripura had a population of 31,508. Males constituted 51% of the population and females 49%. Shikaripura had an average literacy rate of 71%, higher than the national average of 59.5%: male literacy was 75%, and female literacy was 67%. In Shikarpur, 12% of the population were under 6 years of age.

References

External links 

 Shikaripura Town Panchayat website

Shikaripur
Taluks in Shimoga District
Cities and towns in Shimoga district